Robert Matiebel (born 25 November 1973) is a German former professional footballer who played as a midfielder.

References

External links
 

1973 births
Living people
German footballers
Association football midfielders
Bundesliga players
VfL Bochum players
Hamburger SV II players
TuS Dassendorf players
Place of birth missing (living people)